The 2010 BMW Ljubljana Open was a professional tennis tournament played on outdoor hard courts. It was part of the 2010 ATP Challenger Tour. It took place in Ljubljana, Slovenia between September 20 and 26, 2010.

Singles main-draw entrants

Seeds

 Rankings are as of September 13, 2010.

Other entrants
The following players received wildcards into the singles main draw:
  Luka Gregorc
  Tilen Žitnik
  Borut Puc
  Thomas Muster

The following players received entry as a special entrant into the singles main draw:
  Janez Semrajc

The following players received entry from the qualifying draw:
  Ivan Bjelica
  Boris Pašanski
  Erling Tveit
  Miljan Zekić

Champions

Singles

 Blaž Kavčič def.  David Goffin, 6–2, 4–6, 7–5

Doubles

 Nikola Mektić /  Ivan Zovko def.  Marin Draganja /  Dino Marcan, 3–6, 6–0, [10–3]

External links
Site about Slovenian Tennis
ITF Search 

BMW Ljubljana Open
Clay court tennis tournaments
Tennis tournaments in Slovenia
2010 in Slovenian tennis
BMW Ljubljana Open